Hazem Shammas is a Palestinian Australian actor. He won the 2018 Logie Award for Most Outstanding Supporting Actor for Safe Harbour and was nominated for the 2018 AACTA Award for Best Lead Actor in a Television Drama for the same role.

Filmography
TV
The Twelve (2022) TV Series - Farrad Jessim (10 episodes)
The Clearing (TBA) TV series; In production
My Life Is Murder (2019) TV series - Adam Jaber (1 episode)
The Hunting (2019) TV mini series - Robert (3 episodes)
Safe Harbour (2018) TV mini series - Ismail Al-Bayati (4 episodes)
At Home with Julia (2011) TV series - Asrif the Cabbie (1 episode)
Underbelly: The Golden Mile (2010) TV series - Bill Bayeh (10 episodes)
East West 101 (2009) TV series - Massoud (1 episode)
All Saints (2009) TV series - Gazza (1 episode)
Film
Alex & Eve (2016) - Mohomad
X: Night of Vengeance (2011) - Willie
I Wish I Were Stephanie V (2009) - Imran Bashir
The Tumbler (2008) - Tahir

References

External links
 

Australian male television actors
Palestinian male actors
Living people
Year of birth missing (living people)